Vanessa Raynbird is a former footballer for Southampton Women's F.C..  Raynbird's greatest achievement was the winning the 1981 WFA Cup Final. Since retiring she has coached Portsmouth FC. Raynbird currently works as 
the director of football for the Hampshire FA.

Honours
 Southampton
 FA Women's Cup: 1980–81

References

Living people
Women's association football midfielders
Southampton Women's F.C. players
English women's footballers
Female association football managers
FA Women's National League players
English women's football managers
People from Basingstoke
Year of birth missing (living people)